Budtameez (English: Insolent) is a 1966 Bollywood film produced by Jagdish Varma and directed by Manmohan Desai. It stars Shammi Kapoor, Sadhana in lead roles, along with Brahm Bhardwaj, Laxmi Chhaya, Jagdish Raj, Kanan Kaushal, Purnima, Sunder, Kamal Mehra in supporting roles.

Budtameez’s distinctiveness arises from the star buzz provided by its leading cast members Sadhana and Shammi Kapoor, individually, and as a pair. In the five years (1961 to 1965) preceding the release of Budtameez, Sadhana had on average at least one annual hit film which was on the list of the ten highest-grossing films for the year. Specifically, she was the lead female cast member in the hit films Mere Mehboob (1963), Woh Kaun Thi? (1964), Rajkumar (1964), Arzoo (1965) and Waqt (1965).

According to Upperstall, an online reference website, “If Sadhana was the definitive enduring female icon of the swinging 1960s, then without a doubt her male counterpart was Shammi Kapoor. Certainly no other Hindi film hero made the art of boy chasing girl a more enjoyable and playful affair than Shammi Kapoor.” Like Sadhana, in the five years preceding the release of Budtameez, Shammi Kapoor too had on average at least one annual hit film which was on the list of the ten highest-grossing films for the year. In particular, he played the male lead in the hit films Junglee (1961), Dil Tera Deewana (1962), Professor (1962), China Town (1962), Kashmir Ki Kali (1964), Rajkumar (1964) and Jaanwar (1965).

Finally, two years before acting in Budtameez, Shammi Kapoor and Sadhana acted as a pair for the first time in the hit film Rajkumar (1964), which was the fifth highest-grossing film of 1964, attesting to their audience appeal as a pair.

Plot

The plot in Budtameez is very loosely based on The Taming of the Shrew in which an impetuous and obstinate shrew is "tamed" into getting into a relationship by a suitor using various psychological torments to change her into a submissive and docile partner.

In Budtameez's retelling of this tale, the plot begins with Shyam Kumar (Shammi Kapoor), who plays the suitor in this film. Shyam lives in Allahabad with his stepmother (Manorama) and step-sister Beena (Kanan Kaushal). Apparently, Beena had met with an accident because of Shyam and requires the use of a wheelchair. As Shyam's stepmother keeps on niggling him to get a job, Shyam goes to Bombay in search of one and gets a job running the household of the wealthy Raja Bahadur Murti Sagar (Brahm Bhardwaj).

The story picks up with the introduction of Shanta (Sadhana), the "shrew" of the movie, who is Rajabahadur's orphaned granddaughter. Shanta has grown up hating men because her father was an alcoholic who abused her mother until she committed suicide. Understandably, Shanta has turned into an impetuous and ill-mannered person, particularly so to servants like Gopal (Sunder), who works for the household.

Earlier Rajabahadur had bought in Rita (Purnima) into the household to get Shanta to mend her ways, but Rita's efforts have been unsuccessful. To make matters worse, Shanta's ego is relentlessly fueled by Devdas (Kamal Mehra), who clearly wants to marry her. As part of his efforts to draw Shanta's attention, he persistently engages in weird behaviors, such as dressing up as characters like Robin Hood, and even a donkey. Fed up with his lack of success, Rajabahadur entrusts the task of reforming Shanta to Shyam.

Much of the remaining movie deals with Shyam's repeated attempts to tame Shanta. Things begin to change when Shyam and Shanta take a road trip. The introduction of retired Col. Jung Bahadur (Jagdish Raj) during the trip provides a defining moment that helps change Shanta's behavior. Slowly, but surely, Shanta and Shyam fall in love, much to the delight of Rajabahadur, who starts making arrangements for their marriage. Shyam returns to Allahabad to inform his stepmother and stepsister about the upcoming marriage.

The plot subsequently takes an unexpected twist. Rajabahadur receives an invitation for Shyam and Kamla's wedding. The question remains who is Kamla and why is Shyam rejecting Shanta and marrying her? What will happen to Shanta? The plot unfolds with the resolution of the complications that have developed because of this watershed event in the story.

Cast
Shammi Kapoor as Shyam Kumar 
Sadhana as Shanta
Purnima as Rita
Kanan Kaushal as Beena 
Manorama as Shyam's Stepmother
Laxmi Chhaya as Shanta's Friend
Jagdish Raj as Colonel Jung Bahadur
Sunder as Gopal
Kamal Mehra as Devdas
Brahm Bhardwaj as Raja Bahadur Murti Sagar

Soundtrack
The music of the film was composed by the duo Shankar–Jaikishan and the songs were penned by lyricists Hasrat Jaipuri and Shailendra.

References

External links 
 

1966 films
1960s Hindi-language films
Films scored by Shankar–Jaikishan
Films directed by Manmohan Desai